

Suborder Epiprocta

Infraorder Epiophlebioptera

Family Epiophlebiidae 
Epiophlebia laidlawi
Epiophlebia superstes

Infraorder Anisoptera

Family Aeshnidae

Family Austropetaliidae 
Archipetalia auriculata
Austropetalia patricia
Austropetalia tonyana
Austropetalia victoria
Eurypetalia altarensis
Eurypetalia excrescens
Hypopetalia pestilens
Ophiopetalia araucana
Ophiopetalia auregaster
Ophiopetalia diana
Ophiopetalia pudu
Phyllopetalia apollo
Phyllopetalia stictica
Rheopetalia apicalis
Rheopetalia rex

Family Chlorogomphidae

Family Cordulegastridae 
Anotogaster antehumeralis
Anotogaster basalis
Anotogaster chaoi
Anotogaster cornutifrons
Anotogaster flaveola
Anotogaster gregoryi
Anotogaster klossi
Anotogaster kuchenbeiseri
Anotogaster nipalensis
Anotogaster sakaii
Anotogaster sieboldii
Anotogaster xanthoptera
Cordulegaster annandalei
Cordulegaster bidentata
Cordulegaster bilineata
Cordulegaster boltonii
Cordulegaster brevistigma
Cordulegaster diadema
Cordulegaster diastatops
Cordulegaster dorsalis
Cordulegaster erronea
Cordulegaster helladica
Cordulegaster heros
Cordulegaster insignis
Cordulegaster jinensis
Cordulegaster lunifera
Cordulegaster maculata
Cordulegaster magnifica
Cordulegaster mzymtae
Cordulegaster nachitschevanica
Cordulegaster obliqua
Cordulegaster orientalis
Cordulegaster parvistigma
Cordulegaster pekinensis
Cordulegaster picta
Cordulegaster plagionyx
Cordulegaster princeps
Cordulegaster sarracenia
Cordulegaster sayi
Cordulegaster talaria
Cordulegaster trinacriae
Cordulegaster vanbrinkae
Cordulegaster virginiae
Neallogaster choui
Neallogaster hermionae
Neallogaster latifrons
Neallogaster ornata
Neallogaster schmidti

Family Corduliidae 

Aeschnosoma auripennis
Aeschnosoma elegans
Aeschnosoma forcipula
Aeschnosoma marizae
Aeschnosoma rustica
Antipodochlora braueri
Apocordulia macrops
Archaeophya adamsi
Archaeophya magnifica
Austrocordulia leonardi 
Austrocordulia refracta
Austrocordulia territoria 
Austrophya mystica
Cordulephya bidens
Cordulephya divergens
Cordulephya montana
Cordulephya pygmaea
Cordulia aenea
Cordulia amurensis 
Cordulia shurtleffii
Dorocordulia lepida
Dorocordulia libera
Epitheca bimaculata
Epitheca canis
Epitheca costalis
Epitheca cynosura
Epitheca marginata
Epitheca petechialis
Epitheca princeps
Epitheca semiaquea
Epitheca sepia
Epitheca spinigera
Epitheca spinosa
Epitheca stella
Gomphomacromia chilensis
Gomphomacromia fallax
Gomphomacromia nodisticta
Gomphomacromia paradoxa
Guadalca insularis
Helocordulia selysii
Helocordulia uhleri
Hemicordulia apoensis
Hemicordulia asiatica
Hemicordulia assimilis
Hemicordulia australiae
Hemicordulia chrysochlora
Hemicordulia continentalis
Hemicordulia cupricolor
Hemicordulia cyclopica
Hemicordulia eduardi
Hemicordulia ericetorum
Hemicordulia erico
Hemicordulia fideles
Hemicordulia flava
Hemicordulia gracillima
Hemicordulia haluco
Hemicordulia hilaris
Hemicordulia hilbrandi
Hemicordulia intermedia
Hemicordulia kalliste
Hemicordulia koomia
Hemicordulia lulico
Hemicordulia mindana
Hemicordulia mumfordi
Hemicordulia novaehollandiae
Hemicordulia oceanica
Hemicordulia okinawensis
Hemicordulia olympica
Hemicordulia pacifica
Hemicordulia silvarum
Hemicordulia similis
Hemicordulia superba
Hemicordulia tau
Hemicordulia tenera
Hemicordulia toxopei
Hemicordulia virens
Hesperocordulia berthoudi
Heteronaias heterodoxa
Idionyx burliyarensis
Idionyx carinata
Idionyx claudia
Idionyx corona
Idionyx galeata
Idionyx iida
Idionyx imbricata
Idionyx intricata
Idionyx laidlawi
Idionyx minima
Idionyx montana
Idionyx murcia
Idionyx nadganiensis
Idionyx nilgiriensis
Idionyx optata
Idionyx orchestra
Idionyx periyashola
Idionyx philippa
Idionyx rhinoceroides
Idionyx saffronata
Idionyx salva
Idionyx selysi
Idionyx stevensi
Idionyx thailandica
Idionyx travancorensis
Idionyx unguiculata
Idionyx victor
Idionyx yolanda
Idionyx yunnanensis
Idomacromia jillianae
Idomacromia lieftincki
Idomacromia proavita
Lathrocordulia garrisoni 
Lathrocordulia metallica
Lauromacromia bedei
Lauromacromia dubitalis 
Lauromacromia flaviae 
Lauromacromia luismoojeni
Lauromacromia picinguaba
Libellulosoma minuta
Macromidia asahinai 
Macromidia atrovirens 
Macromidia donaldi
Macromidia ellenae  
Macromidia fulva 
Macromidia genialis
Macromidia hanzhouensis 
Macromidia ishidai
Macromidia kelloggi
Macromidia rapida 
Macromidia samal  
Macromidia shiehae 
Metaphya elongata
Metaphya micans
Metaphya stueberi
Metaphya tillyardi
Micromidia atrifrons
Micromidia convergens
Micromidia rodericki
Navicordulia amazonica
Navicordulia atlantica
Navicordulia errans
Navicordulia kiautai
Navicordulia leptostyla
Navicordulia longistyla
Navicordulia mielkei
Navicordulia miersi
Navicordulia nitens
Navicordulia vagans
Neocordulia androgynis
Neocordulia batesi
Neocordulia biancoi
Neocordulia campana
Neocordulia carlochagasi
Neocordulia caudacuta
Neocordulia fiorentini
Neocordulia gaucha
Neocordulia griphus
Neocordulia mambucabensis
Neocordulia matutuensis
Neocordulia santacatarinensis
Neocordulia setifera
Neocordulia volxemi
Neophya rutherfordi
Nesocordulia flavicauda
Nesocordulia malgassica
Nesocordulia mascarenica
Nesocordulia rubricauda
Nesocordulia spinicauda
Nesocordulia villiersi
Neurocordulia alabamensis
Neurocordulia michaeli
Neurocordulia molesta
Neurocordulia obsoleta
Neurocordulia virginiensis
Neurocordulia xanthosoma
Neurocordulia yamaskanensis
Oxygastra curtisii
Paracordulia sericea
Pentathemis membranulata
Procordulia affinis
Procordulia artemis
Procordulia astridae
Procordulia fusiformis
Procordulia grayi
Procordulia irregularis 
Procordulia jacksoniensis
Procordulia karnyi
Procordulia leopoldi
Procordulia lompobatang
Procordulia moroensis
Procordulia papandayanensis
Procordulia rantemario
Procordulia sambawana
Procordulia smithii
Procordulia sylvia
Pseudocordulia circularis
Pseudocordulia elliptica
Rialla villosa
Santosia machadoi
Santosia marshalli
Santosia newtoni
Somatochlora albicincta
Somatochlora alpestris
Somatochlora arctica
Somatochlora borisi
Somatochlora brevicincta
Somatochlora calverti
Somatochlora cingulata
Somatochlora clavata
Somatochlora daviesi
Somatochlora dido
Somatochlora elongata
Somatochlora ensigera
Somatochlora filosa
Somatochlora flavomaculata
Somatochlora forcipata
Somatochlora franklini
Somatochlora georgiana
Somatochlora graeseri
Somatochlora hineana
Somatochlora hudsonica
Somatochlora incurvata
Somatochlora kennedyi
Somatochlora linearis
Somatochlora lingyinensis
Somatochlora margarita
Somatochlora meridionalis
Somatochlora metallica
Somatochlora minor
Somatochlora nepalensis
Somatochlora ozarkensis
Somatochlora provocans
Somatochlora sahlbergi
Somatochlora semicircularis
Somatochlora septentrionalis
Somatochlora shanxiensis
Somatochlora taiwana
Somatochlora tenebrosa
Somatochlora uchidai
Somatochlora viridiaenea
Somatochlora walshii
Somatochlora whitehousei
Somatochlora williamsoni
Syncordulia gracilis
Syncordulia venator
Williamsonia fletcheri 
Williamsonia lintneri

Family Gomphidae

Family Libellulidae

Family Macromiidae

Family Neopetaliidae 
 Neopetalia punctata

Family Petaluridae 
Petalura gigantea
Petalura hesperia
Petalura ingentissima
Petalura litorea
Petalura pulcherrima
Phenes raptor
Tachopteryx thoreyi
Tanypteryx hageni
Tanypteryx pryeri
Uropetala carovei
Uropetala chiltoni

Family Synthemistidae 

 
Dragonflies